Lamentations 2 is the second chapter of the Book of Lamentations in the Hebrew Bible or the Old Testament of the Christian Bible, part of the Ketuvim ("Writings"). This chapter continues the elegies of the prophet Jeremiah, as he laments the misery of Jerusalem, and its causes, and their enemies' derision, leading to an exhortation to true sorrow and repentance. The chapter concludes with a fervent prayer in verses 18 (or 19) to 22.

Text 
The original text was written in Hebrew language. This chapter is divided into 22 verses.

The chapter is acrostic, divided into 22 stanzas or verses. The stanzas consist of triplets of lines (excepting Lamentations 2:19, which contain four lines) each beginning with the letters of the Hebrew alphabet in regular order (twenty-two in number).

Textual versions
Some early witnesses for the text of this chapter in Hebrew are of the Masoretic Text, which includes Codex Leningradensis (1008). Fragments containing parts of this chapter were found among the Dead Sea Scrolls, i.e., 4Q111 (4QLam; 30‑1 BCE) with the extant verse  5.

There is also a translation into Koine Greek known as the Septuagint, made in the last few centuries BCE. Extant ancient manuscripts of the Septuagint version include Codex Vaticanus (B; B; 4th century), Codex Sinaiticus (S; BHK: S; 4th century; extant verses 1–20), Codex Alexandrinus (A; A; 5th century) and Codex Marchalianus (Q; Q; 6th century).

Verse 1
 How the Lord has covered the daughter of Zion
 With a cloud in His anger!
 He cast down from heaven to the earth
 The beauty of Israel,
 And did not remember His footstool
 In the day of His anger.
 "How" (Hebrew: Eichah): repeating the title of the book/collection, and also in Lamentations 4:1. 
 "How the Lord has covered": Or, "How" doth "אדני 'ădonāy cover." 
 "The daughter of Zion": i.e. Jerusalem.
"Cast down" into the "pit" or dungeon of Hades.
 "The beauty of Israel": i.e. Jerusalem, just as Babylon is called "the proud beauty [or, 'ornament'] of Chaldea".

Verse 10
The elders of the daughter of Zion
Sit on the ground and keep silence;
They throw dust on their heads
And gird themselves with sackcloth.
The virgins of Jerusalem
Bow their heads to the ground.
This verse illustrates Judean mourning rites.

Verses 16–17
In , two initial letters, "Ayin" and "Pe", are transposed. This is found is three instances in the whole book (Lamentations 2:16-17; 3:46–51; 4:16–17). Grotius thinks the reason for the inversion of two of the Hebrew letters, is that the Chaldeans, like the Arabians, used a different order from the Hebrews; in the first Elegy (chapter 1), Jeremiah speaks as a Hebrew, in the following ones, as one subject to the Chaldeans, but Fausset thinks it is doubtful.

Verse 19
"Arise, cry out in the night,
At the beginning of the watches;
Pour out your heart like water before the face of the Lord.
Lift your hands toward Him
For the life of your young children,
Who faint from hunger at the head of every street."
This verse "introduces the language of prayer, even repentance; and in this anticipates themes of chapter 3".

See also
 Jacob
 Judah
 Jerusalem
 Zion
Related Bible parts: Psalm 99, Psalm 132, Isaiah 14, Matthew 11

Notes

References

Sources

External links

Jewish
Lamentations 2 Hebrew with Parallel English
Lamentations 2 Hebrew with Rashi's Commentary

Christian
Lamentations 2 English Translation with Parallel Latin Vulgate

02